Ollendorff is a surname. Notable people with the surname include:

Franz Ollendorff (1900–1981), Israeli physicist
Heinrich Gottfried Ollendorff (1803–1865), German grammarian and language educator
Henry B. Ollendorff (1907–1979), German-born US social worker